The 1975 New Zealand bravery awards were announced via a Special Honours List dated 27 June 1975, and recognised three people for acts of bravery earlier that year.

George Medal (GM)
 Robert Donald Spary – of Cromwell; pilot and managing director of Alpine Helicopters Ltd., Queenstown.

Queen's Commendation for Brave Conduct
 Selwyn James Barron – of Waipukurau.

Queen's Commendation for Valuable Service in the Air
 Samuel Duncan Bunting Anderson – pilot, James Aviation Ltd., Helicopter Division, Auckland.

References

Bravery
Bravery awards
New Zealand bravery awards